Stig is a plain in eastern Serbia, in the southern part of the Pannonian Plain, in the lower course of the Mlava River, from its inflow into the Danube (or rather its small arm, Dunavac) to Homolje Mountains. It includes the larger settlements of Požarevac and Petrovac na Mlavi.

Geography

Settlements
Kostolac
Kličevac
Drmno

References

Stig, Serbia at Geographic.org

Plains of Serbia
Braničevo District
Geography of Southern and Eastern Serbia
Geographical regions of Serbia